The name Lionrock has been used to name three tropical cyclones in the northwestern Pacific Ocean. The name was submitted by Hong Kong for replacing Tingting and refers to Lion Rock, a name of a peak which overlooks Kowloon Peninsula.

Severe Tropical Storm Lionrock (2010) (T1006, 07W, Florita) - a relative weak storm impacted Taiwan and Fujian, China.
Typhoon Lionrock (2016) (T1610, 12W, Dindo) - a powerful tropical cyclone which made a cyclonic loop, and became the first tropical cyclone to make landfall on the Pacific coast of northeastern Japan.

Tropical Storm Lionrock (2021) (T2117, 22W, Lannie)

Pacific typhoon set index articles